States of India''' ranked in order of percentage of families
owning a house as per the Census of India 2011.

According to Census 2011, Bihar had the highest number of households who owned their houseswith 96.8% households are having houses. National average stands at 86.6%. In States, Sikkim have lowest home ownership 64.5%. In union territory, Daman & Diu have lowest home ownership with 38.3%.

States by Home Ownership

References